Inarwa railway station (NP-INRWA) is a station located on Jaynagar-Kurtha-Bardibas Rail Line project in Nepal. The station falls inside Janaknandini Rural Municipality of Dhanusha District in Madhesh Province. As Inarwa is the first railway station on this route, there has been built a custome check point with the station. The station has four platforms. The preceding station is Jaynagar railway station which is just 3 km far from Inarwa railway station. The following station is Khajuri railway station which is 4 km far from Inarwa.

References

Railway stations in Nepal
Railway stations opened in 2022